Schrecklichkeit (German: "terror" or "frightfulness") is a word used by English-speakers to describe a military policy of the Imperial German Army towards civilians in World War I. It was the basis of German actions during its march through Belgium in 1914. Similar policies were followed later in France, in the Russian-held area of Poland and in Russia.

Usage of term
The word Schrecklichkeit is not used in any modern Germanic languages. The plural Schrecklichkeiten is known but is hardly used and generally with an ironic connotation. As for modern German, the terms Abschreckung (deterrence) or even Vergeltung (vengeance, retribution, retaliation) would more correctly describe such military forms of punishment.

Wartime context
When Germany invaded Belgium in 1914, the German High Command expected to sweep through the country with negligible opposition. The German Army was many times larger and stronger than the Belgian Army, and the Germans therefore thought that any resistance by Belgium would be futile. German leaders had even suggested to the Belgian government that in the event of war, the Belgians should just line up along the roads and watch the Germans march through. Belgium's refusal to accept those German presumptions and its resistance to the German advance came as a surprise and disrupted the German timetable for advancing into France.

That frustration was communicated to the German troops in Belgium. Anything that delayed the German advance was to be crushed mercilessly. The Belgians were viewed as irrational and even treacherous for their opposition.

That led to exaggerated suspicions among German commanders of Belgian civilian resistance. It is possible that some Belgian civilians engaged in resistance, but none was documented. It is certain that on several occasions, German commanders declared, probably in unconscious error, that such acts had occurred when they had not.

The Germans responded to those perceived acts of resistance with harsh measures. In several villages and towns, hundreds of civilians were executed. Many buildings were put to the torch. Priests who were thought guilty of encouraging the resistance were killed. Violence by German soldiers against Belgians, such as rape, was ignored or not seriously punished. The Belgian city of Leuven was largely destroyed. One German officer later wrote about the town, "We shall wipe it out... Not one stone will stand upon another. We will teach them to respect Germany. For generations people will come here and see what we have done".

Those actions, taken in a period of near-panic as the German forces desperately tried to carry out their flanking march before Allied forces could respond, proved to be a propaganda disaster for Germany since reports of them caused a wave of indignation, which aided the Allied cause.

Analysis
The German argument for many years was that the actions in Belgium were the result of civilian resistance and that the Belgian government was to blame for the "illegal warfare". Echoes of that can be found as late as the 1990s in such works as Deutsche Geschichte of Thomas Nipperdey and in the 1996 edition of the Brockhaus Enzyklopädie. John Horne and Alan Kramer in German Atrocities 1914: A History of Denial contest that. Based on several sources, they contend that the German Army faced no irregular forces in Belgium and France during the first two-and-a-half months of World War I but that it believed otherwise by erroneous reports of civilian resistance and, as a result, responded inappropriately and with excessive force.

See also 
Rape of Belgium
Destruction of Kalisz
Shock and awe

References

World War I crimes by Imperial Germany
German Empire in World War I
Military history of Germany
German words and phrases